Toto is a given name which may refer to:

 Toto of Nepi (died 768), Roman duke
 Toto Landero (born 1995), Filipino boxer
 Toto Makgolokwe (died 1927), paramount chief of the Batlharo tribe of South Africa
 Toto Mwandjani, Malagasy guitarist
 Toto Sena Govou (born 1989), French-Beninese footballer
 Toto Tamuz (born 1988), Nigerian-born Israeli footballer
 Toto Wong (born 1999), Hong Kong swimmer

See also

Tono (name)